The Chimney Sweepers Regulation Act 1864 (27 & 28 Vict c 37) was a British Act of Parliament that amended the Chimney Sweepers and Chimneys Regulation Act 1840 passed to try to stop child labour. Commissioners appointed in 1862 reported that several thousand children aged between five and fourteen years, including many girls, were working for sweeps. The bill was proposed by Lord Shaftesbury.

The 1840 Act prohibited any person under 21 being compelled or knowingly allowed to ascend or descend a chimney or flue for sweeping, cleaning or coring. This was widely ignored by the Master Sweeps and the homeowners. This Act proposed stiff fines and imprisonment for non-compliant master sweeps. It gave the police power to arrest sweeps thought to be breaking the law, and gave Board of Health inspectors the authority to examine new or remodelled chimneys.

References
Notes

Bibliography

United Kingdom Acts of Parliament 1864
United Kingdom labour law
Child labour law
1864 in labor relations